Muggia is an Italian town and comune in the south-west of the Province of Trieste, in the region of Friuli-Venezia Giulia on the border with Slovenia. Lying on the eastern flank of the Gulf of Trieste in the northern Adriatic Sea, Muggia is the only Italian port town in Istria. The town's architecture is marked by its Venetian and Austrian history, and its harbour hosts a modern 500-berth marina for yachts (Porto San Rocco).

Muggia lies in northern Istria. Its territory, limited on the sea-side by a shoreline of more than  featuring a coastal road and on the border side by a hill system, Monti di Muggia, including Mt. Castellier, Mt. S. Michele, Mt. Zuc and Monte d'Oro, that dominate over a vast landscape of Triestinian and Istrian coast, is characterized by a rich sub-continental vegetation of both Karstic and Istrian type.

It has a border crossing, known as San Bartolomeo, with Slovenia and the extreme east of the comune at Lazaretto. The Slovenian border crossing is called Lazaret in the Municipality of Koper.

Name
Muggia was attested in historical sources as Mugla in AD 933. The origin of the name Muggia is uncertain; it may have arisen from Latin  'cut short, mutilated', in reference to a short projection from the land or a cape (cf. the cape north of Zadar, attested in Latin as Muchla bona in AD 1250, now Croatian Oštri rat). Another possibility is derivation from Latin *mūcla 'milestone', and another hypothesis is that it comes from Vulgar Latin *Lamūc(l)a 'small swamp'. The Slovene name Milje was borrowed from Proto-Romance Mugla (developing via *Mygla > *Migla > Milje).

History

Muggia originated as a prehistoric fortified village (castelliere), around 8th-7th century BC. The territory was conquered in 178–177 BC by the Romans, who created here a settlement (Castrum Muglae). After the fall of the Western Roman Empire, Muggia was under Ostrogoth, Lombard, Byzantine, Avar and Frank dominations, until, in 931, king Hugh of Italy donated it to the Patriarch of Aquileia.

Before the year 1000 a new settlement was built on the seashore. After the 13th century the new village, now grown to the status of city, pronounced itself a municipality and defined its territory as bordering with those of Trieste and Koper, but stayed still politically bound to the Patriarchy of Aquileia. From this period are the cathedral and the city hall, the latter having been rebuilt in the last century. In 1420 it became part of the Republic of Venice.

After Venice's fall in 1797, Muggia became part of the Austrian Empire, under which it developed an important naval shipbuilding industry which flourished until after World War II. Throughout the Austro-Hungarian period it remained part of the Margravate of Istria, first within the Kingdom of Illyria and then, after 1861, within the Austrian Littoral. The municipality of Muggia historically extended further south than today, including several settlements that are now part of Slovenia: Ankaran, Hrvatini, Elerji, Škofije, and Plavje.

After World War I and the dissolution of Austria-Hungary, the town was annexed to the Kingdom of Italy and incorporated into the Province of Trieste. In the 1930s, the area developed a strong Communist underground activity against Benito Mussolini's Fascist regime. In 1945, it was occupied by the Yugoslav People's Army and from 1947 to 1954 it was part of the Free Territory of Trieste, a formally independent territory directly administered by the United Nations. The territory was internally divided into two zones ruled by military governors - Muggia ended up in the northern Zone A ruled by Anglo-Americans, while the southern Zone B was ruled by the Yugoslav army. In 1954 the two zones were handed over to Italian and Yugoslav civilian governments and de facto annexed by the two countries in an arrangement finally formalized in the 1975 Treaty of Osimo, which established the former borders between Zones as the new Italy-Yugoslavia international border. Following the breakup of Yugoslavia in the early 1990s it formed the border between Italy and the newly independent Slovenia. Following Slovenia's accession to the European Union in May 2004 and the passport-free Schengen Area in January 2008, all border controls have been removed, making the Italian-Slovenian border which runs just south and east of Muggia, practically invisible to travellers.

Main sights
Muggia provides many evident traces of its Venetian traditions and origin, as showed by the dialect, the gastronomic traditions, the gothic-venetian style of some houses, the devious "calli", the loggias, the ogive arches, the ancient coats of arms on the façades but mostly the main square, a true Venetian "campiello".

Memories of its early ages include an important pre-historic "castelliere" on Mt. Castellier (S. Barbara) and Roman (Archaeological Park of Castrum Muglae) and medieval remains in Muggia Vecchia (Old Muggia), once one of the guarding castles that in the 10th century were built to defend the Istrian border against the invasion of the Hungarians.

The Castle of Muggia, destroyed in 1353 by the Triestines, retains several remains of the previous period such as the ruins of the walls. A tower dating back to 1374 was due to the Patriarch of Aquileia Marquard of Muggia. Later in 1735, under the government of the Republic of Venice, it was restored, but it was totally abandoned during the following century.
The Castle was restored by its current owners, the sculptor Villi Bossi and his wife Gabriella, and may be visited upon request.

The most important art attraction is the little basilica of Santa Maria Assunta (10th-13th century), housing frescoes from the 14th-15th centuries. The Duomo, dating from the 13th century, with a white stone facade with a Gothic rose window and a lunette containing a high relief representing the Holy Trinity adored by Saints John and Paul, is located on Muggia's main square.

Culture
Among the occurrences characterizing the socio-cultural life of this small city is well worth mentioning the Carnival of Muggia.

The Carnival absorbs much of the population of Muggia engaging them in the construction of allegoric carts articulated and moving in order to better mock the chosen victim and in the realization of gorgeous costumes. During those seven days the city becomes a true open-air theatre offering a continuous entertainment that previsibly climaxes in the great parade on the last Sunday.
The town also has a museum of modern art named after sculptor Ugo Carà.

International relations

Sister cities / Twin towns
  Koper, Slovenia
  Obervellach, Austria

Notable residents
Willer Bordon (1949–2015), politician
Villi Bossi (born 1939), sculptor
Giovanni Cattai (born 1945), football player
Niccolò Giani (1909–1941), philosopher and journalist
Dario Hübner (born 1967), football player
Giuseppe Tarlao (1904–1978), football player
Vittorio Vidali (1900–1983), communist activist and politician

Muggia comune

Towns
Muggia

Villages
Aquilinia
Boa
Chiampore
Lazzaretto
Villaggio Castalietto

See also

Istria
Venezia Giulia
Plavje

References

External links

 
Muggia town's Guide
Porto San Rocco Marina in Muggia

Italy–Slovenia border crossings